Hagamasha was an Indo-Scythian Northern Satrap (ruled in Mathura in the 1st century BCE, probably after 60 BCE).

Name
Hagamasha's name is attested on his coins in the Brahmi form , which is derived from the Saka name , meaning "whose chariot proceeds in front".

Reign
In central India, the Indo-Scythians are thought to have conquered the area of Mathura over Indian kings around 60 BCE, thus founding the Northern Satraps. Some of their first satraps were Hagamasha and Hagana, who were in turn followed by Rajuvula, but according to some authors, Rajuvula may have been first.

In the archaeological excavations of Sonkh, near Mathura, the earliest coins of the Kshatrapa levels were those of Hagamasha.

References

External links
Dates of Kanishka and the Indo-Scythians

Indo-Scythian kings
1st-century monarchs in Asia
1st-century Iranian people